The 1940 Swansea East by-election was a parliamentary by-election held for the British House of Commons constituency of Swansea East on 5 February 1940.  The seat had become vacant on the resignation from the House of Commons of the Labour Member of Parliament David Williams, who had held the seat since the 1922 general election.

During World War II, the major parties had agreed not to contest by-elections when vacancies arose in seats held by the other parties, so the Labour candidate, David Mort, was returned unopposed.  Mort represented the constituency until his death in 1963, triggering another by-election.

Result

See also
Swansea East (UK Parliament constituency)
1919 Swansea East by-election
1963 Swansea East by-election
List of United Kingdom by-elections

References

Further reading 
 
 
A Vision Of Britain Through Time (Constituency elector numbers)

1940 elections in the United Kingdom
1940 in Wales
1940s elections in Wales
20th century in Swansea
February 1940 events
Elections in Swansea
By-elections to the Parliament of the United Kingdom in Welsh constituencies
Unopposed by-elections to the Parliament of the United Kingdom (need citation)
1940s in Glamorgan